Platyja is a genus of moths of the family Erebidae erected by Jacob Hübner in 1823.

Description
Palpi with second joint broad, quadrately scaled and reaching vertex of head, and short, blunt and naked third joint. Thorax and abdomen smooth, where abdomen clothed with long coarse hair dorsally. Tibia and hind tarsi very hairy in male. Forewings with highly arched costa towards apex, which is produced and acute. The outer margin obliquely curved. Hindwings with short cell and truncate anal angle.

Species

References

Calpinae